is a railway station in the city of Kashiwazaki, Niigata, Japan, operated by East Japan Railway Company (JR East).

Lines

Station layout
The station consists of two ground-level opposed side platforms connected by a footbridge, serving two tracks. The station is unattended.

Platforms

History
Kitajō Station opened on 1 July 1897. With the privatization of Japanese National Railways (JNR) on 1 April 1987, the station came under the control of JR East.

Surrounding area

Kitajō Post Office
Kitajō Elementary School
Kitajō Middle School
site of Kitajō Castle

See also
 List of railway stations in Japan

External links

 JR East station information 

Railway stations in Niigata Prefecture
Railway stations in Japan opened in 1897
Shin'etsu Main Line
Stations of East Japan Railway Company
Kashiwazaki, Niigata